Swarna may refer to

Swarna Mallawarachchi, Sri Lankan actress
Swarna Jayanti Express, an Indian train
Swarna Jayanti Rajdhani Express, an Indian Rajdhani train
Lucknow Swarna Shatabdi Express, an Indian Train
Swarna Kamalam, Telugu film
Swarna Trishna (Bengali film), a Bengali film